Ulolonche is a genus of moths of the family Noctuidae.

Species
 Ulolonche consopita (Grote, 1881)
 Ulolonche culea (Guenée, 1852)
 Ulolonche dilecta (H. Edwards, 1884)
 Ulolonche disticha (Morrison, 1875)
 Ulolonche fasciata Smith, 1888 (=Ulolonche marloffi (Barnes & Benjamin, 1924))
 Ulolonche modesta (Morrison, 1875)
 Ulolonche niveiguttata (Grote, 1873)
 Ulolonche orbiculata (Smith, 1891)

References
Natural History Museum Lepidoptera genus database
Ulolonche at funet

Hadeninae